Single-stranded RNA virus refers to RNA viruses with single-stranded RNA genomes.  There are two kinds:

 Negative-sense single-stranded RNA virus
 Positive-sense single-stranded RNA virus

See also
 Double-stranded RNA viruses
 DNA virus

Riboviria
RNA viruses